HD 180555 is a binary star in the equatorial constellation of Aquila. It consists of a two stars, orbiting with an orbital period of 8.95 years and an eccentricity of 0.43. A third component lies at an angular separation of 8.32, but it is unrelated to the system.

References

External links
 HR 7307
 CCDM 19164+1433
 Image HD 180555

Aquila (constellation)
180555
B-type main-sequence stars
7307
Binary stars
Durchmusterung objects
094720